Oak Ridge is a census-designated place and unincorporated area in Orange County, Florida, United States. The population was 22,685 at the 2010 census. It is part of the Orlando–Kissimmee–Sanford, Florida Metropolitan Statistical Area.

Geography
Oak Ridge is located at  (28.474596, -81.420738).

Demographics

As of the census of 2000, there were 22,349 people, 7,389 households, and 5,379 families residing in the CDP.  The population density was 2,074.3/km (5,370.9/mi2).  There were 7,791 housing units at an average density of 723.1/km (1,872.3/mi2).  The racial makeup of the CDP was 43.08% White, 28.44% African American, 0.41% Native American, 5.67% Asian, 0.29% Pacific Islander, 13.92% from other races, and 8.19% from two or more races. Hispanic or Latino of any race were 41.42% of the population.

There were 7,389 households, out of which 41.5% had children under the age of 18 living with them, 43.0% were married couples living together, 21.4% had a female householder with no husband present, and 27.2% were non-families. 18.0% of all households were made up of individuals, and 2.5% had someone living alone who was 65 years of age or older.  The average household size was 3.02 and the average family size was 3.40.

In the CDP, the population was spread out, with 29.6% under the age of 18, 12.7% from 18 to 24, 34.9% from 25 to 44, 17.5% from 45 to 64, and 5.3% who were 65 years of age or older.  The median age was 29 years. For every 100 females, there were 101.9 males.  For every 100 females age 18 and over, there were 101.0 males.

The median income for a household in the CDP was $30,290, and the median income for a family was $31,422. Males had a median income of $21,991 versus $18,573 for females. The per capita income for the CDP was $12,347.  About 17.2% of families and 19.6% of the population were below the poverty line, including 25.9% of those under age 18 and 11.6% of those age 65 or over.

References

Unincorporated communities in Orange County, Florida
Census-designated places in Orange County, Florida
Greater Orlando
Census-designated places in Florida
Unincorporated communities in Florida